Henas (Persian: هناس) is a 2022 Iranian drama film directed by Hossein Darabi and written by Ehsan Saghafi and Mahdieh Einollahi. The film was screened for the first time at the 40th Fajr Film Festival where it was nominated for Best Original Score.

Premise 
The story of a couple whose flights are canceled on the eve of a trip to Germany and the woman gradually realizes that her husband is working on the country's nuclear activities. So she tries to dissuade her husband from doing so, and when confronted with her husband's opposition, she takes direct action.

Cast 

 Merila Zarei as Shohreh Pirani
 Behrouz Shoeibi as Dariush Rezainejad
 Vahid Rahbani as Farhad Nadaf
 Siavash Tahmoures
 Solmaz Ghani
 Amin Miri
 Alireza Naeeini
 Kosar Heydari

Reception

Awards and nominations

References

External links 

 

Iranian drama films
2020s Persian-language films